Redondo is a Portuguese wine region centered on the Redondo municipality in the Alentejo region. The region was initially an Indicação de Proveniencia Regulamentada (IPR) region, then elevated to Denominação de Origem Controlada (DOC) status. In 2003, it became one of eight subregions of the Alentejo DOC. Its name may still be indicated together with that of Alentejo, as Alentejo-Redondo.

The region is bordered by the Borba subregion to the northeast, the Evora subregion to the west and the Reguengos subregion to the southeast. The area is known predominantly for its fruity red wines.

Grapes
The principle grapes of the Redondo region includes Aragonez, Fernao Pires, Manteudo, Moreto, Periquita, Rabo de Ovelha, Roupeiro, Tamarez and Trincadeira.

See also
List of Portuguese wine regions

References

Wine regions of Portugal
Portuguese products with protected designation of origin